The Eyes, the Mouth is a 1982 Italian-French drama film  written and directed by Marco Bellocchio and starring Lou Castel.

The film was entered into the main competition at the 39th edition of the Venice Film Festival.

Plot

Cast
 Lou Castel as Giovanni (Pippo) Pallidissimi
 Ángela Molina as Wanda
 Emmanuelle Riva as The mother
 Michel Piccoli as Uncle Agostino
 Antonio Piovanelli as Wanda's father
 Viviana Toniolo as Adele
 Antonio Petrocelli as The doctor

See also
 List of Italian films of 1982

References

External links
 

1982 drama films
1982 films
Films directed by Marco Bellocchio
Italian drama films
French drama films
Films with screenplays by Vincenzo Cerami
Films scored by Nicola Piovani
1980s Italian-language films
1980s Italian films
1980s French films
Italian-language French films